Aimee Romualdez Marcos-Bernedo (born May 2, 1979) is a Filipina musician and public figure known as the drummer of indie music band The Dorques. She is the adopted daughter of the late former Philippine President Ferdinand Marcos and former first lady Imelda Marcos.

She was the only member of the immediate Marcos family to still be a minor when martial law was formally lifted in 1981 and when the Marcoses went into exile in Honolulu in 1986, and has stayed away from politics.

She is currently living in Cagayan de Oro with her husband, Cid Bernedo, and their son.

See also 
 Marcos dynasty
 Original Pilipino music

References 

Aimee
1979 births
Filipino drummers
Living people
21st-century drummers
Filipino adoptees
Filipino women musicians